Luigi Carillo (born 8 August 1996) is an Italian footballer who plays as a defender for  club Novara.

Career
He made his Serie B debut for Juve Stabia on 30 May 2014 in a game against Carpi.
On 6 July 2018, Carillo signed with Serie A club Genoa.

On 17 August 2018, Carillo joined Serie B side Brescia on loan until 30  June 2019.

On 12 July 2019, Carillo joined Serie B club Salernitana on loan until 30 June 2020.

On 29 August 2019, after appearing just once on the bench for Salernitana, he was recalled from loan and sent on a different loan to Serie C club Sambenedettese instead.

On 16 September 2020 he joined Casertana on loan.

On 18 August 2021 he signed a two-year contract with ACR Messina.

On 26 July 2022, Carillo moved to Novara on a two-year deal.

References

External links
 
 

1996 births
Living people
Footballers from Naples
Italian footballers
Association football defenders
Serie B players
Serie C players
S.S. Juve Stabia players
Catania S.S.D. players
S.S. Akragas Città dei Templi players
Paganese Calcio 1926 players
Pisa S.C. players
Genoa C.F.C. players
Brescia Calcio players
U.S. Salernitana 1919 players
A.S. Sambenedettese players
Casertana F.C. players
A.C.R. Messina players
Novara F.C. players